375 Pearl Street (also known as Intergate.Manhattan, the Verizon Building, and One Brooklyn Bridge Plaza) is a 32-story office and datacenter building in the Civic Center of Lower Manhattan in New York City, at the Manhattan end of the Brooklyn Bridge. The building was built for the New York Telephone Company and was completed in 1975. In 2016, the building underwent a renovation.

History

The building was built for the New York Telephone Company and was completed in 1975.  The building originally appeared windowless but had several  (some with glass) running up the building. As it approached completion, The New York Times architecture critic Paul Goldberger decried it as the "most disturbing" of the phone company's new switching centers because it "overwhelms the Brooklyn Bridge towers, thrusts a residential neighborhood into shadow and sets a tone of utter banality."

In the 1990s and 2000s, Verizon switching operations included a small DMS-100 telephone exchange and a Switching Control Center System.  The building's CLLI code, its identification in the telecommunications industry, was NYCMNYPS. The Pearl Street CS2K softswitch was the recipient of voice traffic from decommissioned legacy switches in the city.

2000s
The building played an important part in recovering service to the New York City Police Department following the September 11, 2001 attacks.
Prior to May 2002, the building featured the logo of New York Telephone and Bell Atlantic, but that month, that sign was removed and replaced with the logo of Verizon.

In September 2007 it was announced that Taconic Investment Partners had purchased the building from Verizon, which leased back floors 8 through 10.  Taconic bought the 1.098-million-square-foot building for $172.05 million, which amounted to $185 a foot when property was selling in Manhattan for $500 a foot. Other appeals of the building were its 16- to  ceilings and  floor plans as well as the naming rights. Taconic had announced plans to replace the facade with a glass curtain wall designed by Cookfox. The New York Times wrote:

Paul E. Pariser, co-chief executive of Taconic, said a reporter had told him: 'Mr. Pariser, you have a challenge cut out for you — turning a G.E. dishwasher into an office building.' I like that challenge.

2010s to present

In early June 2011, data center operator Sabey Data Center Properties purchased the deed in lieu of foreclosure from M&T Bank for $120 million, considerably less than what Taconic had paid a few years earlier. Sabey had initially intended to partner with YoungWoo & Associates but instead hired National Real Estate Advisors as its development partner. Sabey intended to redevelop the property as a major Manhattan data center and technology building called Intergate.Manhattan. John Sabey, president of the company, said Intergate.Manhattan would appeal to "new scientific, academic and medical research centers" in addition to data center tenants.

In 2012, The Daily Telegraph ranked 375 Pearl Street as the 20th "ugliest building in the world". Starting in 2016, the building was renovated. The limestone walls on the top 15 stories were removed and replaced with plate glass panels to improve the building's aesthetics and attract traditional office tenants. Leasing of the office stories had started in January 2016. Sabey placed the 15th through 30th stories for sale in 2018 for over $300 million. The space was instead leased to tenants like the New York City Police Department and Rafael Viñoly Architects. Viñoly Architects bought the floors that it occupied in July 2020.

Sabey and National Real Estate Advisors refinanced the building in June 2021. Wells Fargo and JPMorgan Chase gave the owners a $220 million fixed-rate loan as well as a $30 million mezzanine loan.

Tenants
The building was traditionally home primarily to telecommunications tenants, but following the renovations has attracted numerous traditional office users. Following the 2021 New York City mayoral election, the space also contained an office for mayor Eric Adams.

Following the renovation, Rafael Viñoly Architects signed a 20-year,  lease for the 31st floor of the building in July 2018.

See also

33 Thomas Street
Verizon Building, 140 West Street

References

External links

1976 establishments in New York City
Civic Center, Manhattan
Office buildings completed in 1976
Skyscraper office buildings in Manhattan
Telecommunications buildings in the United States
Telephone exchange buildings